All Roads Lead to Calvary is a 1921 British silent drama film directed by Kenelm Foss and starring Minna Grey, Bertram Burleigh and Mary Odette. It is partly based on the 1919 novel of the same name by Jerome K. Jerome. A fisherman becomes a Member of Parliament, but is torn between his career, mistress and wife.

Cast
 Minna Grey as Nan Phillips  
 Bertram Burleigh as Bob Phillips  
 Mary Odette as Joan Allway  
 Roy Travers as Preacher  
 Julie Kean as Hilda Phillips  
 J. Nelson Ramsay as Mr. Alway  
 David Hallett as Arthur Allway  
 George Travers as Editor  
 Lorna Rathbone as Editor's Wife  
 Kate Gurney as Landlady

References

Bibliography
 Low, Rachael. History of the British Film, 1918–1929. George Allen & Unwin, 1971.

External links

1921 films
1921 drama films
British silent feature films
British drama films
Films directed by Kenelm Foss
Films based on British novels
Films based on works by Jerome K. Jerome
Films set in England
British black-and-white films
1920s English-language films
1920s British films
Silent drama films